List of victories of Carl Menckhoff

 
Carl Menckhoff was a German flying ace of the First World War. He scored 20 aerial victories as a sergeant-pilot for Jagdstaffel 3 before becoming an officer commanding Jagdstaffel 72. While leading this fighter squadron, he scored 19 more aerial victories. His 39 aerial victories are listed below.

This list is complete for entries, though obviously not for all details. Doubled lines in list marks transition between jagdstaffeln. Information was abstracted from Above the Lines: The Aces and Fighter Units of the German Air Service, Naval Air Service and Flanders Marine Corps, 1914–1918, pp. 163–164, and from The Aerodrome webpage  Abbreviations from those sources were expanded by editor creating this list.

References
 Franks, Norman; Frank W. Bailey; Russell Guest. Above the Lines: The Aces and Fighter Units of the German Air Service, Naval Air Service and Flanders Marine Corps, 1914–1918. Grub Street, 1993. , .

Aerial victories of Menckhoff, Carl
Menckhoff, Carl